Eliezer Shlomovich (born 1947) is an Israeli former footballer who played for Maccabi Netanya.

His younger brother Moshe also played football; both played together at Maccabi Netanya.

Honours
 Israeli Premier League: 1970-71, 1973–74
 Israeli Supercup: 1971, 1974

References

1947 births
Living people
Israeli Jews
Israeli footballers
Maccabi Netanya F.C. players
Liga Leumit players
Italian emigrants to Israel
Association football forwards